Sherrill Township is a township in Texas County, in the U.S. state of Missouri.

Sherrill Township was erected in 1848, taking its name from Joel and John Sherrill, pioneer citizens.

References

Townships in Missouri
Townships in Texas County, Missouri